The Turkey men's national tennis team represents Turkey in Davis Cup tennis competition and are governed by the Türkiye Tenis Federasyonu.

Turkey currently compete in the Europe/Africa Zone of Group I.  They have raised, again second time, the Group I Feb 2023.

History
Turkey competed in its first Davis Cup in 1948.

Current team (2023) 

 Altuğ Çelikbilek
 Cem Ilkel
 Ergi Kırkın
 Yankı Erel
 Alaattin Bora Gerçeker (Captain-player)

See also
Davis Cup
Turkey Fed Cup team

External links

Davis Cup teams
Tennis
Davis Cup